The 1994 Winter Paralympics, the sixth Paralympic Winter Games, were held in Lillehammer, Norway, from 10 to 19 March 1994. These Games marked the second time the Paralympic Winter Games were held in the same location as the Winter Olympics and with the first with the same Organizing Committee, a tradition that has continued through an agreement of cooperation between the International Olympic Committee (IOC) and the International Paralympic Committee (IPC).  Ice sledge hockey, which became an immediate crowd favorite, was added to the program.

These Paralympic Games are the only to be held two years after the previous Games due to the shift in the Summer and Winter games schedule. The 1994 Winter Games were the first Paralympic Games organized by the International Paralympic Committee (IPC).

Symbol and mascot of the games
The Games were represented by an emblem depicting the sun people. This image portrayed the ideas of power, vitality, strength and energy, all of which are characteristics of the athletes who took part. These characteristics were also to be found in the mascot Sondre, the troll. Sondre, who was also an amputee, was the result of a nationwide school competition won by Janne Solem. The mascot was then designed to its final appearance by Tor Lindrupsen. The name for the mascot was chosen in a separate competition and derives from the great skiing pioneer Sondre Nordheim.

Medalists 
The 1994 Paralympics consisted 133 events in five disciplines in four sports. Ice sledge hockey made its Paralympic debut as the first winter team sport at these games.

 Alpine skiing
 Sledge hockey
  Ice sledge racing
 Nordic skiing
 Biathlon
 Cross-country skiing

Medal table

The top 10 NPCs by number of gold medals are listed below. The host nation (Norway) is highlighted.

Participants
Thirty-one National Paralympic Committees (NPCs) entered athletes at the 1994 Winter Paralympics.  The number in parentheses indicates the number of participants from each NPC.

 (6)
 (38)
 (2)
 (2)
 (2)
 (31)
 (6)
 (3)
 (13)
 (18)
 (26)
 (43)
 (23)
 (1)
 (23)
 (26)
 (2)
 (2)
 (1)
 (1)
 (2)
 (6)
 (7)
 (42)
 (15)
 (27)
 (11)
 (14)
 (27)
 (19)
 (30)

See also

 1994 Winter Olympics
 1994 Winter Paralympics medal table

References

External links
International Paralympic Committee
The event at SVT's open archive 

 
Paralympics
International sports competitions hosted by Norway
Winter Paralympic Games
1994 in Norwegian sport
Sport in Lillehammer
Winter multi-sport events in Norway
March 1994 events in Europe